On January 18, 2007, Congressmen Michael McNulty (D-NY) and Dave Camp (R-MI) introduced legislation  to reinvest funds in America's most abundant renewable resource – solar power. 
Title: "Securing America's Energy Independence Act of 2007.",  
January 18, 2007:    Referred to the House Committee on Ways and Means.

February 14, 2007 – Senators Gordon H. Smith (R-OR) and Ken Salazar (D-CO)  introduced legislation to stimulate investment in America's most abundant renewable resource – solar power. 
Title: "Securing America's Energy Independence Act of 2007.", 
February 14, 2007 Referred to Senate committee. Status: Read twice and referred to the Committee on Finance.

Proposed legislation of the 110th United States Congress
United States federal legislation articles without infoboxes
United States federal energy legislation